The annual Eko International Film Festival (EKOIFF) is an international film festival held in Lagos, Nigeria. The Eko International Film Festival was founded and established in 2009 by Hope Obioma Opara, the CEO of Supple Communications Limited, under which the festival is held. He is also the publisher of Supple magazine, an African cinema and culture journal that features film previews, reviews, and interviews. The purpose of the Eko International Film Festival is to develop tourism in Nigeria by promoting appreciation of the arts and culture through the motion picture arts and sciences.

Eko International Film Festival Events 
The first edition took place in the summer of 2010 in the megacity of Lagos, with filmmakers from Nigeria, Kenya, the United Kingdom, Germany, France, Spain, and the United States. The subsequent editions took place in the Silverbird Galleria's Silverbird Cinemas on Victoria Island, Lagos. until now

The festival accepts films in the 6 categories listed below:

Feature Film, Short Film, Fiction, Documentaries, Short Documentaries and Indigenous Film.

The Inaugural Edition

The maiden edition was held between the 7th and 12 July in 2010 at the Genesis Deluxe Cinemas of The Palms in Lekki, Lagos

2011 Eko International Film festival

The second edition of Eko International Film festival (EKOIFF), was held from July 9 through 14, 2011. This edition of Eko International film Festival was themed ‘‘Nollywood -maximizing the Nigerian Film Industry”.

2015 Eko International Film festival

2018 Eko International Film Festival

Filmmakers, cinema aficionados, and students from Nigeria and beyond attended daily film screenings, masterclasses, and panel discussions at the 8th edition, which took place from March 5 to 10, 2018.

2019 Eko International Film festival

The festivals ninth edition, featured over 208 films from around the world, with the United States of America topping the list with 58 films. Nigeria has 43, Canada has 30, the United Kingdom has 19, Germany has 13, France has 11, India has ten, Russia has seven, Australia and Italy each have six, and Brazil has only five. Short narratives, feature films, documentaries, and African indigenous films make up this collection.

2020 Eko International Film festival

2021 Eko International Film Festival

Celebrating a decade the festival was celebrated in glam style and received entries from over 55 countries around the world for the period of March 8 to 12, 2021. The United States Consulate in Nigeria, Makido Film Austria, the Polish Embassy in Nigeria, the Niger State Government (Niger State Book and other Intellectual Resources Development Agency, Multichoice Nigeria Ltd, Nexim Bank and Bank of Industry (BOI), the Nigeria Film and Video Censors Board (NFVCB), and the Silverbird Group (Silverb) have all contributed to the film festival.

References 

Film festivals in Lagos
Film festivals established in 2010
Nigerian film awards
Film festivals in Nigeria